Choerophryne gudrunae is a species of frog in the family Microhylidae. It is endemic to Papua New Guinea and is only known from its type locality near Kowat in the Adelbert Range, Madang Province.

Etymology
This species was originally described in the genus Albericus, named for Alberich, the dwarf in Scandinavian mythology and Richard Wagner's opera cycle Der Ring des Nibelungen. Menzies named the species he described after Alberich's companions in the mythodology. The specific name gudrunae is derived from Gudrun.

Description
Choerophryne gudrunae is a comparatively small species: three unsexed individuals in the type series measure  in snout–urostyle length. Choerophryne gudrunae  shares the general appearance of other former Albericus species: brown dorsum with lighter or darker irregular mottling, warty dorsal skin, and short and road head with blunt snout and relatively large eyes. Compared to other species with "click" calls, it has comparatively short forearms and long legs.

The male advertisement call is a short series of clicks (~10) emitted in rapid succession.

Habitat and conservation
Choerophryne gudrunae is a poorly known species. Choerophryne gudrunae was quite common there. Shifting cultivation is a threat to its habitat.

References

gudrunae
Amphibians of Papua New Guinea
Endemic fauna of Papua New Guinea
Amphibians described in 1999
Taxonomy articles created by Polbot